BC most often refers to:

 Before Christ, a calendar era based on the traditionally reckoned year of the birth of Jesus of Nazareth
 British Columbia, the westernmost province of Canada
 Baja California, a state of Mexico

BC may also refer to:

Arts and entertainment 
 "B.C.", a song by Sparks from the 1974 album Propaganda
 B.C. (comic strip) by Johnny Hart, and one of its characters
 BC (video game) by Lionhead Studios
 BC The Archaeology of the Bible Lands, a BBC television series
 Bullet Club, a professional wrestling stable

Businesses and organizations 
 Basilian Chouerite Order of Saint John the Baptist, an order of the Greek Catholic Church
 BC Card, a Korean credit card company
 Bella Center, a conference center in Copenhagen, Denmark
 Brasseries du Cameroun, a brewery in Cameroon (also known as SABC)
 Brunswick Corporation (NYSE ticker symbol BC)

Education

United States 
 Bakersfield College, a college in Bakersfield, California
 Bellevue College, a college in Bellevue, Washington
 Benedictine College, a college in Atchison, Kansas
 Benedictine Military School, a high school in Savannah, Georgia
 Bergen Catholic High School, a high school in Oradell, New Jersey
 Boston College, a university in Chestnut Hill, Massachusetts
 Boston College Eagles, its athletic teams
 Brazosport College, a college in Lake Jackson, Texas
 Broward College, a college in Fort Lauderdale, Florida

Worldwide 
 Baccalaureus or bc, a Bachelor's degree in the Netherlands
 Baghdad College, a high school in Baghdad, Iraq
 British Council

Science and technology 
 Backcrossing, a crossing of a hybrid with one of its parents, or a genetically similar individual
 Backward compatibility, the ability of new software to work similarly to its predecessor
 Ballistic coefficient, a measure of air drag on a projectile
 Base curve radius, a parameter of a contact lens
 Battle command, a military discipline
 Bayonet cap, a standard light bulb connection
 bc (programming language), an arbitrary-precision calculator language
 Black carbon, a carbonaceous component of soot
 Bliss bibliographic classification, a library cataloguing system
 × Brassocattleya or Bc., an orchid genus
 Buoyancy compensator (diving), a piece of scuba diving equipment

Transportation 
 NZR BC class, a type of steam locomotive
 Skymark Airlines (IATA airline code BC)

Other uses 
 Bullcrap, a phrase denoting something worthless
 "B.C.", nickname of Burr Chamberlain (1877–1933), American football player and coach
 Baguio, a city in the Philippines, locally abbreviated as "B.C."
 BC Powder, a brand of pain reliever
 BookCrossing, a website that encourages leaving books in public places to be found by others

See also 
 BC Cygni, a red supergiant star that is one of the largest stars
 Belaruskaja Čyhunka (BCh), the national railway company of Belarus
 Blind carbon copy (Bcc:), the practice of sending an e-mail to multiple recipients without disclosing the complete list of recipients